Sphegina tristriata is a species of syrphid fly in the family Syrphidae.

Distribution
India.

References

Eristalinae
Insects described in 1913
Diptera of Asia
Taxa named by Enrico Adelelmo Brunetti